Jozef Konečný (born 2 December 1953) is a Slovak gymnast. He competed in eight events at the 1980 Summer Olympics.

References

1953 births
Living people
Slovak male artistic gymnasts
Olympic gymnasts of Czechoslovakia
Gymnasts at the 1980 Summer Olympics
Sportspeople from Bratislava